Lepidophorum is a monotypic genus of flowering plants in the daisy family. Its only known species is Lepidophorum repandum, native to Spain and Portugal.

References

Anthemideae
Monotypic Asteraceae genera
Flora of Spain
Flora of Portugal
Endemic flora of the Iberian Peninsula
Taxa named by Noël Martin Joseph de Necker